Jang Hye-jin may refer to:

 Jang Hye-jin (singer) (born 1965), South Korean singer
 Jang Hye-jin (actress) (born 1975), South Korean actress
 Chang Hye-jin (born 1987), South Korean archer